Neophylax aniqua is a species of caddisfly in the family Thremmatidae. It is found in North America.

References

Integripalpia
Articles created by Qbugbot
Insects described in 1947